Joanikije is the Serbian variant of Greek name Ioannikios. It may refer to:

Joanikije I, Serbian Archbishop (1272–76)
Joanikije II, Serbian Archbishop (1338–46) and first Serbian Patriarch (1346–54)
Joanikije III, Serbian (1739–46) and later Ecumenical Patriarch (1761–1763)
Joanikije (Pamučina) (1810-1870), Serbian Orthodox bishop and writer from Herzegovina
Joanikije I (1890–1945), Metropolitan of Montenegro and Serbian Orthodox saint
Joanikije Mićović (born 1959), current Metropolitan of Montenegro and the Littoral

Joanikije of Devič, 15th-century saint
Serbian masculine given names